In chemistry, the pentazenium cation (also known as pentanitrogen) is a positively-charged polyatomic ion with the chemical formula  and structure . Together with solid nitrogen polymers and the azide anion, it is one of only three poly-nitrogen species obtained in bulk quantities.

History
Within the High Energy Density Matter research program, run by the U.S. Air Force since 1986, systematic attempts to approach polynitrogen compounds began in 1998, when Air Force Research Laboratory at Edwards AFB became interested in researching alternatives to the highly toxic hydrazine-based rocket fuel and simultaneously funded several such proposals.

Preparation

Chemistry
For this reason,  must be prepared and handled in a dry environment:

A number of salts, such as fluoride, azide, nitrate, or perchlorate, cannot be formed.

Structure and bonding 
In valence bond theory, pentazenium can be described by six resonance structures:
,
where the last three structures have smaller contributions to the overall structure because they have less favorable formal charge states than the first three.

According to both ab initio calculations and the experimental X-ray structure, the cation is planar, symmetric, and approximately V-shaped, with bond angles 111° at the central atom (angle N2–N3–N4) and 168° at the second and fourth atoms (angles N1–N2–N3 and N3–N4–N5). The bond lengths for N1–N2 and N4–N5 are 1.10 Å and the bond lengths N2–N3 and N3–N4 are 1.30 Å.

See also
 Pentazole
 Azide
 Pentazenium tetraazidoborate

References 

Cations
Nitrogen
Explosive chemicals